Naticarius is a genus (or subgenus) of predatory sea snails, marine gastropods in the subfamily Naticinae of the family Naticidae, the moon snails.

The species within this genus were previously placed in the genus Natica, subgenus Naticarius. This classification is still used by a number of leading malacologists.

The operculum in this genus is calcareous.

Species 
Species within the genus Naticarius include:
 Naticarius alapapilionis (Röding, 1798)
 Naticarius canrena (Linnaeus, 1758)
 Naticarius colliei (Récluz, 1844)
 Naticarius concinnus (Dunker, 1860)
 Naticarius donghaiensis (X.-T. Ma & S.-P. Zhang, 2003)
 Naticarius excellens Azuma, 1961
 Naticarius hainanensis (X. Liu, 1977)
 Naticarius hebraeus (Martyn, 1786)
 Naticarius insecta (Jousseaume, 1874)
 Naticarius lineozona (Jousseaume, 1874)
 Naticarius manceli (Jousseaume, 1874)
 Naticarius melanoperculatus (X. Liu, 1977)
 Naticarius onca (Röding, 1798)
 Naticarius orientalis (Gmelin, 1791)
 Naticarius philippinensis (R. B. Watson, 1881)
 Naticarius pumilus Kubo, 1997
 Naticarius scopaespira (X. Liu, 1977)
 Naticarius sertatus (Menke, 1843)
 Naticarius stercusmuscarum (Gmelin, 1791)
 Naticarius zonalis (Récluz, 1850)
Species brought into synonymy 
 Naticarius cruentatus (Gmelin, 1791) sensu Poppe & Goto, 1991: synonym of Naticarius hebraeus (Martyn, 1786)
 Naticarius fanel (Röding, 1798): synonym of Naticarius hebraeus (Martyn, 1786)
 Naticarius lavendula Woolacott, 1956: synonym of  Natica buriasiensis Récluz, 1844
 Naticarius lineatus (Röding, 1798): synonym of Tanea lineata (Röding, 1798)
 Naticarius marochiensis (Gmelin, 1791): synonym of Natica marochiensis (Gmelin, 1791)
 Naticarius oteroi Fernandes & Rolán, 1990: synonym of Natica oteroi (Fernandes & Rolán, 1991)
 Naticarius punctatus (Karsten, 1789): synonym of Naticarius stercusmuscarum (Gmelin, 1791)
 Naticarius subcostatus (Tenison Woods, 1878): synonym of Notocochlis subcostata (Tenison Woods, 1878)
 Naticarius vittatus (Gmelin, 1791): synonym of Natica vittata (Gmelin, 1791)

References 

 Torigoe K. & Inaba A. (2011). Revision on the classification of Recent Naticidae. Bulletin of the Nishinomiya Shell Museum. 7: 133 + 15 pp., 4 pls

Naticidae